Andreas Kaltoft (born 22 May 1998) is a Danish professional footballer who plays as a defender.

Club career
Kaltoft rose through the ranks of Danish third tier club B.93. On 1 November 2016, he made his debut for the first team at age 16 as a late substitute in the home match against Nykøbing FC which was won 3–2. That made him the youngest player to make a senior debut for B.93 since 1920.

Kaltoft attracted interest from Danish Superliga club Brøndby IF which resulted in him signing onto a youth contract with the team. One year later, Kaltoft was signed by Danish 1st Division team Vendsyssel FF on a deal keeping him in Northern Jutland until 2020. This move reunited him with former teammate Emmanuel Ogude, who he played with in B.93. In the summer of 2018 yet another former B.93 teammate Sebastian Czajowski joined the Northern Jutland team. At the end of his first season with Vendsyssel FF Kaltoft helped the team qualify for the Danish Superliga for the first time  and he made his Superliga debut in a match against AaB in June 2018. He scored his first Superliga goal in a 1–1 draw against Hobro IK on 16 September 2018.

References

External links
 
Andreas Kaltoft at the DBU national team database

Living people
1998 births
Danish men's footballers
People from Gentofte Municipality
Association football defenders
Danish Superliga players
Danish 1st Division players
Danish 2nd Division players
Boldklubben 1903 players
Brøndby IF players
Boldklubben af 1893 players
Vendsyssel FF players
Sportspeople from the Capital Region of Denmark